Microvoluta amphissa is a species of sea snail, a marine gastropod mollusk in the family Volutomitridae.

Description
The length of the shell attains 6.156 mm.

Distribution
From the tropical Pacific surrounding New Caledonia.

References

 Bouchet, P. & Kantor, Y., 2004. New Caledonia: the major centre of biodiversity for volutomitrid molluscs (Mollusca: Neogastropoda: Volutomitridae). Systematics and Biodiversity 1(4): 467–502

Volutomitridae
Gastropods described in 2004